The Basidiobolaceae are a family of fungi in the monotypic order Basidiobolales. All fungal cells of this family are exclusively uninucleate and their relatively large nuclei contain a nucleolus, but no heterochromatin.

They were formerly in the order Entomophthorales.

Classification
 Drechslerosporium Huang, Humber & Hodge 2013
 Schizangiella Dwyer et al. 2006
 Basidiobolus Eidam 1886 [Amphoromorpha Thaxter 1914]

References

Entomophthorales
Fungus families